"Turn It On Again" is a song by the English rock band Genesis featured on their 1980 album Duke. Also released as a single, the song reached number 8 in the UK Singles Chart, becoming the band's second top 10 hit. The lyrics, by Mike Rutherford, concern a man who does nothing more than watch television. He becomes obsessed with the people he watches on it, believing them to be his friends.

The song is featured on the Flash FM station playlist in the game Grand Theft Auto: Vice City Stories.

Background
"Turn It On Again" was built from leftovers from projects by each member: The second set of verses was conceived by Tony Banks for A Curious Feeling: "We kind of put [Rutherford's riff] – the bit he didn't use on Smallcreep's Day, curiously enough – with the bit I didn't use on A Curious Feeling, and put these two together. We made it much more rocky; both bits became much more rocky. My bit was a bit more epic, and Mike's bit was a bit slower and a bit more heavy metal. And then Phil gave it a much more straightforward drum part; perhaps neither of us would have thought that we would want that on that bit [...] We put on one or two other bits, too, that ended up from there".

The song is characterised by a rhythmic structure uncharacteristically complex for pop music but common in the band's progressive rock back catalogue. The song – written mostly by Rutherford, with help from Phil Collins – was originally much slower. Rutherford explains on the Songbook DVD: "I had this riff [plays lead riff on guitar], but at the time I was playing it like this: [plays slower]. And Phil said, 'Why don't you try it in a faster speed?' and then he said to me, 'Do you realize it is in ?' and I said, 'What do you mean, it's in 13? 'No, it's 13.'"

Collins confirms: "You can't dance to it. You see people trying to dance to it every now and again. They get on the off beat but they don't know why". Tony Banks adds: "You can't dance or clap along to it because of that time signature. When we play it live, you can always see the audience getting caught out."

"Turn It On Again" has been a favourite at Genesis's shows. Consequently, the group's 1999 compilation Turn It On Again: The Hits and its 2007 expanded reissue, subtitled The Tour Edition, were named after it, as was the band's 2007 Turn It On Again: The Tour reunion tour. In the 1980s, the band would attach a medley of 1960s pop songs (referred to by the band as the "Blues Brothers" medley, as the first song was "Everybody Needs Somebody to Love"). The song would be returned to its album form for the We Can't Dance tour and the band would later regard the medley as a poor decision. Peter Gabriel played drums when he reunited with his former bandmates at 1982's Six of the Best show and found himself baffled by its time signatures. "It was typical Peter: 'Oh, I can play this'," observed Tony Banks. "But once he started playing, he kept looking around going, Oh fuck! 'Turn It On Again' does funny things – it's truly a Genesis song."

Originally written and recorded in the key of B Major, it was transposed down to A for the 2007 tour and further down to G for the 2021 tour to compensate for the lowering of Collins' voice.

The Duke Suite

"Turn it on Again" was originally a section of a long suite written by the band that was split up into individual songs before it was released. At the time, was just an interlude between the preceding and next sections of the suite.

Chart performance
"Turn It on Again" was a moderate hit in North America, but failed to reach the Top 40 except in regional markets such as Chicago (#31 on WLS-AM).  However, it was a bigger hit in Europe, particularly in the UK where it reached #8.

Personnel 
 Phil Collins – drums, percussion, lead and backing vocals
 Tony Banks – keyboards, backing vocals
 Mike Rutherford – guitars, bass pedals

See also
 Parasocial interaction

References

External links
 Lyrics of this song
 

Genesis (band) songs
1980 songs
1980 singles
Songs written by Phil Collins
Songs written by Tony Banks (musician)
Songs written by Mike Rutherford
Songs about television
Charisma Records singles
Virgin Records singles
Atlantic Records singles